Sidney R. J. Smith  (1858–1913) was a Late Victorian English architect, best known for the work he undertook in the 1880s and 1890s for the philanthropist Henry Tate including the original Tate Gallery at Millbank.

Works

 Outdoor Relief Station, Norwood (1887)
 Tate Free Library, South Lambeth Road (1887)
 Durning Library, Kennington (1889)
 Tate Free Library, Streatham (1890)
 Tate Free Library, Brixton Oval (1892)
 Cripplegate Institute, 1 Golden Lane (1896) 
 National Gallery of British Art (Tate Gallery) (1897)
 16–19 Dunraven Street, Mayfair (1897)
 St Thomas, Telford Park, Streatham Hill (with Spencer William Grant) 
 Tate Mausoleum, West Norwood Cemetery (c.1890)
 Euston Underground station, City and South London Railway (1907) (demolished)

References

1858 births
1913 deaths
19th-century English architects
People associated with transport in London
Transport design in London
History of the London Underground